Supercluster is the astronomical assemblage.

Supercluster may also refer to:
 Supercluster (band)
 Supercluster (genetic)